The seventh season of Deutschland sucht den Superstar was aired on German channel RTL from 6 January to 17 April 2010. The season marked a new national record with more than 35,000 participants. The season's winner was Mehrzad Marashi.

Way to the Top 15

Auditions
The seven Audition episodes were shown every Wednesday and Saturday from 6 January 2010 until 27 January 2010. Open auditions were held in the five cities Frankfurt, Munich, Cologne, Berlin and Hamburg, and in September and October 2009, an auditions truck visited the fifteen cities Freiburg, Mannheim, Stuttgart, Würzburg, Regensburg, Dortmund, Münster, Kassel, Erfurt, Dresden, Halle, Hanover, Bremen, Kiel and Rostock.

"Recall"
The recall had 3 phases. The first phase was shot in a theater in Cologne. The 120 singers were split into 2 groups: Boys and Girls. Then every singer sang his favorite song. After that 55 singers were eliminated and the remaining singers sang in groups to get one of the 35 tickets for the next phase.

The second phase was shot in the Caribbean. The 35 singers sang three times: unaccompanied, in groups and in duos. The Top 25 came into the third phase.

The third and last phase was shot in the Schlosstheater Schwetzingen. The singers sang one song on their own. Then the jury decided which 15 singers came into the Top 15 live-show.

In this season, some of the contestants that had made it to the Top 15 had featured in previous seasons. Helmut Orosz made it to the Top 50 in season two but missing out on the Top 10 during the public vote. Menowin Fröhlich made it to the Top 20 shows in season 3 but was disqualified after being arrested and serving a two-year jail sentence. Kim Debkowski made it to the recall of the previous season but was eliminated after the group performance.

Songs in "Recall 3" by the Top 10
Mehrzad Marashi – "She's Like the Wind"
Menowin Fröhlich – "I Just Called to Say I Love You"
Manuel Hoffmann – "Get Here"
Kim Debkowski – "If I Ain't Got You"
Thomas Karaoglan – "Stand by Me"
Helmut Orosz – "Back to You"
Ines Redjeb – "Release Me"
Nelson Sangare – "U Got It Bad"
Marcel Pluschke – "Blowin' in the Wind"
Steffi Landerer – "Because the Night"

Finalists
(Ages stated at time of contest)

Live shows

Top 15 – "Jetzt oder nie"  (Now or Never)
Original airdate: 13 February 2010

Advancing to Top 10 (Public votes): Thomas, Nelson, Menowin, Kim, Mehrzad, Helmut, Manuel

Advancing to Top 10 (Jury selection):  Marcel, Ines, Steffi

In this season the Top 10 was supposed to be formed by the Top 7 of the viewers vote plus 3 candidates picked by the jury (from the remaining 8 contestants). As a tribute to the viewers' support and the great success of the season the jury denied to choose advancing candidates. Instead they sent the 8th, 9th and 10th of the public vote. That also explains the gender ratio of the Top 10.

Top 10 – "Die Megahits von heute" (Today's Megahits)
Original airdate: 20 February 2010

Jury Elimination Forecast:  Steffi Landerer or Marcel Pluschke
Bottom 4: Ines Redjeb, Steffi Landerer, Helmut Orosz and Nelson Sangare
Eliminated: Steffi Landerer

Top 9 – "Die größten Pop-Hymnen aller Zeiten" (All Time's Greatest Pop-Hymns)
Original airdate: 27 February 2010

Jury Elimination Forecast: Marcel Pluschke or Ines Redjeb (Nina), Ines Redjeb (Volker), Ines Redjeb, Marcel Pluschke or Kim Debkowski (Dieter)
Bottom 4: Kim Debkowski, Ines Redjeb, Marcel Pluschke and Nelson Sangare
Eliminated: Marcel Pluschke

Top 8 – "Happy Holiday Hits"
Original airdate: 6 March 2010

Jury Elimination Forecast: Manuel Hoffmann (Nina, Volker), Kim Debkowski or Manuel Hoffmann (Dieter)
Bottom 4: Ines Redjeb, Nelson Sangare, Manuel Hoffmann and Kim Debkowski
Eliminated: Nelson Sangare

Top 7 – "80s"
Original airdate: 13 March 2010

Jury Elimination Forecast: Manuel Hoffmann or Ines Redjeb
Bottom 4: Helmut Orosz, Ines Redjeb, Manuel Hoffmann and Kim Debkowski
Eliminated: Ines Redjeb

Top 6 – "Deutsch vs. Englisch" (German vs. English)
Original airdate: 20 March 2010

Jury Elimination Forecast: Helmut Orosz
Bottom 3: Helmut Orosz, Manuel Hoffmann and Thomas Karaoglan
Eliminated: Manuel Hoffmann

On the following day, Helmut Orosz was disqualified from the competition after admitting to taking drugs during the competition. Just as done in season 4, the person who was eliminated the past week would be brought back into the competition; in which Manuel Hoffmann advanced to the top 5.

Top 5 – "Balladen & Ballermann" (Ballads & Ballermann)
Original airdate: 27 March 2010

Jury Elimination Forecast: Manuel Hoffmann, Kim Debkowski or Thomas Karaoglan
Bottom 3: Manuel Hoffmann, Kim Debkowski and Thomas Karaoglan
Eliminated: Thomas Karaoglan

Top 4 – "Neue Hits & Alte Hits " (New Hits & Old Hits)
Original airdate: 3 April 2010

Jury Elimination Forecast: Menowin Fröhlich or Kim Debkowski (Nina & Volker), Kim Debkowski (Dieter)
Bottom 2: Kim Debkowski and Manuel Hoffmann
Eliminated: Kim Debkowski

Top 3 – Semi Final (Boygroups, Music Hero & Number 1 Hits) 
Original airdate: 10 April 2010

Live-Act: "Real Love" by Mark Medlock
Jury Elimination Forecast: Manuel Hoffmann (Nina), No Forecast (Dieter & Volker)
Bottom 2: Manuel Hoffmann and Mehrzad Marashi
Eliminated: Manuel Hoffmann

Top 2 – Final (Contestant's Choice, Highlight Song & Winner's Single) 
Original airdate: 17 April 2010

Judges' forecasts of who would win: Menowin Fröhlich

Winner: Mehrzad Marashi

Runner-up: Menowin Fröhlich

Group song
Top 10: "I Gotta Feeling" by The Black Eyed Peas
Top 9: "The Final Countdown" by Europe
Top 8: "Ritmo de la noche" by Chocolate
Top 7: "Wake Me Up Before You Go-Go" by Wham!
Top 6: "Let Me Entertain You" by Robbie Williams
Top 5: "Hey! Baby" by DJ Ötzi
Top 4: "Crying at the Discoteque" by Alcazar
Top 3: "Love Is Gone" by David Guetta
Top 2: "I Gotta Feeling" by The Black Eyed Peas – performed by all Top 10 contestants (with the exception of Helmut Orosz) and "I Came for You" (performed by the two finalists) by The Disco Boys

Elimination chart 

On 13 February, it was supposed that the viewers would choose seven finalists and the judges three. The judges, or better said Dieter Bohlen, however chose to not decide and therefore the next three highest vote getters made it through to the finals automatically. They were Ines Redjeb, Marcel Pluschke and Steffi Landerer.
Helmut Orosz was expelled from the competition due to his drug abuse shown in a video. Therefore, Manuel Hoffmann, who was voted off the last in the competition, was brought back as the replacement.

References 

Season 07
2010 in German music
2010 German television seasons